The following is a list of ecoregions in Equatorial Guinea, according to the Worldwide Fund for Nature (WWF). The country's three distinct geographic regions (Río Muni on the African mainland, Bioko island, and Annobón island) are home to distinct ecoregions.

Terrestrial ecoregions

Tropical and subtropical moist broadleaf forests

 Cross-Sanaga-Bioko coastal forests (Bioko)
 Atlantic Equatorial coastal forests (Río Muni)
 Mount Cameroon and Bioko montane forests (Bioko)
 São Tomé, Príncipe, and Annobón forests (Annobón)

Mangroves

 Central African mangroves (Río Muni)

Freshwater ecoregions
 Central West Coastal Equatorial (Río Muni)
 Northern West Coastal Equatorial (Bioko)
 São Tomé, Príncipe, and Annobón (Annobón)

Marine ecoregions
 Gulf of Guinea Central (Bioko Island, Río Muni)
 Gulf of Guinea Islands (Annobón)

References
 Burgess, Neil, Jennifer D’Amico Hales, Emma Underwood (2004). Terrestrial Ecoregions of Africa and Madagascar: A Conservation Assessment. Island Press, Washington DC.
 Spalding, Mark D., Helen E. Fox, Gerald R. Allen, Nick Davidson et al. "Marine Ecoregions of the World: A Bioregionalization of Coastal and Shelf Areas". Bioscience Vol. 57 No. 7, July/August 2007, pp. 573-583.
 Thieme, Michelle L. (2005). Freshwater Ecoregions of Africa and Madagascar: A Conservation Assessment. Island Press, Washington DC.

 
Equatorial Guinea
Ecoregions